Events in the year 2014 in the capital city of India, Delhi

Incumbents

General Elections

Lok Sabha
Results for General elections to Lok Sabha was declared on 17 May 2014. Outcomes were as follows:

Events

January
 13 January: Monsoon rains lash Delhi and NCR region.

February
 14 February: Politician Arvind Kejriwal resigned from the post of Chief Minister.

March

April

May
 3 May 2014: IPL 2014- Rajasthan Royals vs Delhi Daredevils was hosted.
 5 May 2014: IPL 2014- Delhi Daredevils vs Chennai Super Kings 26th Match was hosted.
 7 May 2014: IPL 2014- Delhi Daredevils vs Kolkata Knight Riders was hosted.
 10 May 2014: IPL 2014- Delhi Daredevils vs Sunrisers Hyderabad was hosted.

June

July
 11 July: Mango festival started in Delhi.
 11 July: Delhi metro allocated Rs 3,470 cr fund in the Union Budget to complete the third phase of NCR lines.
 12 July: Delhi became world's second most populous city.
 15 July: Telecom Regulatory Authority of India (TRAI) Amendment Bill proposed by National Democratic Alliance (NDA) passed in parliament.
 18 July - Finance Minister of India, Arun Jaitley proposed 2014 Delhi Budget in the parliament.
 21 July - Air India launched direct flights between Delhi and Moscow.
 22 July - First Internet de-addiction centre established in Delhi.
 23 July - John Abraham inaugurated Toni and Guy outlet at New Delhi.

References 

Delhi
Delhi
2010s in Delhi